Roper was a Christian pop-punk band formed in Denver, Colorado. The band consisted of Reese Roper (lead singer of Five Iron Frenzy) on lead vocals, Jonathan Byrnside on lead guitar, Jonathan Till on bass, Matt Emmett on rhythm guitar, and Nick White on drums.

Background  

Guerilla Rodeo was a short-lived project founded by Reese Roper, meant to follow his prior band Five Iron Frenzy. In addition to vocalist Reese Roper, the band was formed by fellow Five Iron member Sonnie Johnston (guitar), Ethan Luck (guitar), John Warne (bass, background vocals), and Josh Abbott (drums). The project yielded only a three-track EP, Ride, Rope and Destroy, released in 2004. It has been confirmed by both Ethan Luck and Reese Roper that there never was a fourth, unreleased song recorded for the EP. Reese Roper often compared the sound of the band to Letters to Cleo. Their name was a play on the Rage Against the Machine single "Guerrilla Radio".

When the Guerilla Rodeo project came to an end, Reese reformed the band under his own name, Roper. Roper's full-length album, Brace Yourself for the Mediocre, was produced before the band was officially together and released on Five Minute Walk Records. All songs on the album with the exception of "Day of Pigs" and "You're Still The One" were written by Reese Roper, Masaki Liu, and Ethan Luck. Because of the incomplete state of the band at the time of the album's release, the only official member appearing on the CD is Reese Roper. As a result, the album features many additional musicians such as Frank Lenz (drums), Elijah Thomson (bass), Phil Bennett (organ), Bob Schiveley (guitar), Masaki Liu (guitar), Jason White (additional drums), Ethan Luck (guitar), and many additional vocalists. Some of the songs on the album were originally written for Guerilla Rodeo.  One of the online forums spawned by this group is the Roper Board in which many fans of both Roper and Reese's previous band Five Iron Frenzy congregate.

Roper issued a statement regarding the status of the band in 2006:

In 2009 Reese Roper told HM that the probability of making another album was "somewhere around 3%." The Roper project sold close to 30,000 albums in total, about the same as Brave Saint Saturn and other Five Iron related side projects. He also stated that, in retrospect, the project was "doomed from the beginning," but that musically it was the highlight of his career.

Members
Reese Roper – vocals and synthesizer
Jonathan Byrnside – guitar
Matt "Emo" Emmett – guitar
Johnathan Till – bass guitar
Nick White – drums
Stephen Till – guitar

Discography

References

External links
Roper on Myspace
Concert review from 2004

Christian punk groups
American Christian rock groups
Musical groups from Denver
Musical groups established in 2004
American pop punk groups
Punk rock groups from Colorado
2004 establishments in Colorado